Shoulder sleeve insignia (SSI) are cloth emblems worn on the shoulders of US Army uniforms to identify the primary headquarters to which a Soldier is assigned. Most military units smaller than brigades do not have SSI, but rather wear the SSI of a higher headquarters.

United States Army Commands

Army Corrections Command units

Special operations units

Sustainment Commands (Expeditionary)

Theater Sustainment Commands

See also
 Division insignia of the United States Army
 Brigade insignia of the United States Army

References

The US Army Institute of Heraldry

Heraldry of the United States Army
Shoulder